Yavatmal–Washim Lok Sabha constituency is one of the 48 Lok Sabha (lower house of the Indian parliament) constituencies of Maharashtra state in western India. This constituency was created on 19 February 2008 as a part of the implementation of the Presidential notification based on the recommendations of the Delimitation Commission of India constituted on 12 July 2002. It held its first election in 2009 which was won by Bhavana Gawali of Shiv Sena.

Vidhan Sabha segments
Presently, Yavatmal–Washim Lok Sabha constituency comprises six Vidhan Sabha (legislative assembly) segments.

Members of Parliament

Election results

General elections 2019

General election 2014

General election 2009

See also
 Yavatmal Lok Sabha constituency (1951 to 2004 elections for 1st to 14th Lok Sabha)
 Washim Lok Sabha constituency (1977 to 2004 elections for 6th to 14th Lok Sabha)
 Yavatmal district
 Washim district
 List of Constituencies of the Lok Sabha

Notes

External links
Yavatmal Washim lok sabha constituency election 2019 results details

Lok Sabha constituencies in Maharashtra
Lok Sabha constituencies in Maharashtra created in 2008
Yavatmal district
Washim district